Agbash or Ağbaş may refer to:
 Abovyan, Ararat, Armenia
 Ağbaş, Davachi, Azerbaijan
 Ağbash, Azerbaijan